Vaterpolo klub Partizan is a professional water polo club based in Belgrade, Serbia. VK Partizan is one of the sports clubs in Serbia that is part of sport society Partizan. As of 2021–22 season, the club competes in the Serbian League.

Partizan's home terrain is the pool which is part of the Sportski centar Voždovac on Banjica complex. The club is supported by Grobari, fans of all sport clubs competing under the name of Partizan Belgrade.

With seven European champion titles (the last in 2011 against Pro Recco), VK Partizan is the second most successful European team in water polo history along with Mladost, and behind Pro Recco with ten titles.

History

The club was founded in 1946 and from 1952 is a member of the First League. VK Partizan players had a big influence in Yugoslav and Serbian national water polo teams. They helped Serbia and Yugoslavia win many medals at the Olympics, European and World championships.

Honours

Domestic titles
National League titles
 Yugoslav League Winners (17): 1963, 1964, 1965, 1966, 1968, 1970, 1972, 1973, 1974, 1975, 1976, 1977, 1978, 1979, 1984, 1987, 1988
 Yugoslav Winter Championship (6): 1963, 1965, 1968, 1969, 1971, 1972
 FR Yugoslav League (2): 1995, 2002
 Serbian League Winners (10): 2007, 2008, 2009, 2010, 2011, 2012, 2015, 2016, 2017, 2018

National Cup titles
 Yugoslav Cup Winners (12): 1973, 1974, 1975, 1976, 1977, 1979, 1985, 1987, 1988, 1989, 1991, 1992
 FR Yugoslav Cup Winners (4): 1993, 1994, 1995, 2002
 Serbian Cup Winners (9): 2007, 2008, 2009, 2010, 2011, 2012, 2016, 2017, 2018

European titles
 LEN Champions League Winners (7): 1964, 1966, 1967, 1971, 1975, 1976, 2011
 LEN Trophy Winners (1): 1998
 LEN Cup Winners' Cup Winners (1): 1991
 LEN Super Cup Winners (2): 1991, 2011

First team for 2022/23 season

Season by season

Rankings in Prva A liga
Since 2006–07 season, Partizan has been the champion a record 10 times of Prva A liga.

Notable former players

 Dušan Antunović
 Ozren Bonačić
 Živko Gocić
 Igor Gočanin
 Danilo Ikodinović
 Milorad Krivokapić
 Nikola Kuljača
 Slobodan Nikić
 Dejan Savić
 Zoran Petrović
 Branislav Mitrović
 Gojko Pijetlović
 Theodoros Chatzitheodorou
 Milan Aleksić
 Andrija Prlainović
 Dušan Mandić
 Lucas Gielen
 Stefan Mitrović
 Dušan Popović
 Nikola Stamenić
 Aleksandar Šoštar
 Aleksandar Šapić
 Petar Trbojević
 Vanja Udovičić
 Dejan Udovičić
 Filip Filipović
 Jugoslav Vasović
 Vladimir Vujasinović
 Igor Milanović
 Miloš Korolija
 Predrag Zimonjić
 Zoran Janković
 Mirko Sandić
 Ryan Bailey

Notable former coaches
 Dušan Antunović
 Mirko Sandić
 Nikola Stamenić
 Ratko Rudić
 Nenad Manojlović
 Dejan Udovičić
 Igor Milanović

See also
 ŽVK Partizan

References

External links

 

LEN Euroleague clubs
Water polo clubs in Serbia
Water polo clubs in Serbia and Montenegro
Water polo clubs in Yugoslavia
Sport in Belgrade